The Paul Erdős Award, named after Paul Erdős, is given by the
World Federation of National Mathematics Competitions for those who "have played a significant role in the development of mathematical challenges at the national or international level and which have been a stimulus for the enrichment of mathematics learning". The awards have been given in two-year periods since 1992.

Awardees
 1992:
 Luis Davidson, Cuba
 Nikolay Konstantinov, Russia
 John Webb, South Africa
 1994:
 Ronald Dunkley, Canada
 Walter Mientka, USA
 Urgengtserengiin Sanjmyatav, Mongolia
 Jordan Tabov, Bulgaria
 Peter Taylor, Australia
 Qiu Zonghu, People's Republic of China
 1996:
 George Berzsenyi, USA
 Tony Gardiner, United Kingdom
 Derek Holton, New Zealand
1998:
 Agnis Andzans, Latvia
 , Germany
 Mark Saul, USA
2000:
 Francisco Bellot Rosado, Spain
 , Hungary
 , Hungary
2002:
 Bogoljub Marinkovic, Yugoslavia
 Harold Braun Reiter, United States of America
 Wen-Hsien Sun, Taiwan
2004:
 Warren Atkins, Australia
 , France
 Patricia Fauring, Argentina
2006:
 Simon Chua, Philippines
 Ali Rejali, Iran
 Alexander Soifer, USA
2008:
 , Germany
 Bruce Henry, Australia
 Leou Shian, Taiwan
2010:
Rafael Sanchez-Lamoneda, Venezuela
Yahya Tabesh, Iran
2012:
Cecil C. Rousseau, USA
Paul Vaderlind, Sweden
2014:
Petar Kenderov, Bulgaria
, Hungary
Richard Rusczyk, USA
2016:
Luis Caceres, Puerto Rico
David Christopher Hunt, Australia
Kar-Ping Shum, Hong Kong, China
2018:
Bin Xiong, China
David Monk, United Kingdom
Carlos Gustavo Tamm de Araujo Moreira, Brazil

See also

 List of mathematics awards

Sources
 Homepage of the award.

References 

Paul Erdős
Mathematics awards